John Boson (1655–1730) was a writer in the Cornish language. The son of Nicholas Boson, he was born in Paul, Cornwall. He taught Cornish to William Gwavas. His works in Cornish include an epitaph for the language scholar John Keigwin, and the "Pilchard Curing Rhyme". He also wrote an epitaph for James Jenkins who died in 1710 and also wrote Cornish verse; and translated parts of the Bible, the Lord's Prayer and the Apostles' Creed. The only known surviving lapidary inscription in the Cornish language (to Arthur Hutchens, died 1709), is also his work, and can be found in Paul Church where John Boson, his father, and their relative Thomas Boson are also buried.

His work is collected, along with that of Nicholas and Thomas Boson, in Oliver Padel's The Cornish Writings of the Boson Family (1975).

References

Matthew Spriggs, ‘Boson family (per. c. 1675–1730)’, Oxford Dictionary of National Biography, Oxford University Press, 2004  accessed 11 Oct 2007

1655 births
1730 deaths
Burials in Cornwall
People from Paul, Cornwall
Cornish-language writers
British male writers